Seth Green (born 1974) is an American actor and comedian.

Seth Green may also refer to:

Seth Green (pisciculture) (1817–1888), American pioneer in fish farming
Seth Green (executive), founder of Americans for Informed Democracy
Bruce Seth Green, an American television director